The Singing Cop is a 1938 British musical comedy spy drama, directed by Arthur B. Woods and starring singer Keith Falkner and Chili Bouchier. The film was a quota quickie production, based on a short story by Kenneth Leslie-Smith. It is now classed as a lost film.

Plot
A temperamental opera diva arouses official suspicion that she is a spy, secretly gathering classified information to pass to enemy agents. A policeman who happens to be a talented amateur singer is sent undercover to join the opera company and try to find out whether there is any substance to the allegations. Once there, an immediate attraction springs up between the policeman and a female member of the company. But the diva also sets her sights on him and, used to getting what she wants, becomes the bitter rival-in-love of the other singer. The policeman lets his lady friend into his confidence, and the pair set about sleuthing. They finally prove that all the suspicions were justified and the diva is indeed a foreign agent.

Cast
 Keith Falkner as Jack Richards
 Chili Bouchier as Kit Fitzwillow
 Marta Labarr as Maria Santova
 Ivy St. Helier as Sonia Kassona
 Athole Stewart as Sir Algernon Fitzwillow
 Bobbie Comber as Bombosa
 Glen Alyn as Bunty Waring
 George Galleon as Drips Foster-Hanley
 Ian McLean as Zabisti
 Vera Bogetti as Rosa
 Frederick Burtwell as Dickie
 Robert Rendel as Sir Treves Hallam
 Brian Buchel as Pemberton
 Derek Gorst as Captain Farquhar

References

External links 
 
 The Singing Cop at BFI Film & TV Database

British musical comedy films
1938 films
1938 musical comedy films
Films directed by Arthur B. Woods
Lost British films
British black-and-white films
1938 lost films
Lost musical comedy films
Films shot at Rock Studios
1930s English-language films
1930s British films